Cheyenne Roundup is a 1943 American Western film directed by Ray Taylor and written by Elmer Clifton and Bernard McConville. The film stars Johnny Mack Brown, Tex Ritter, Fuzzy Knight, Jennifer Holt, Harry Woods and Roy Barcroft. The film was released on April 12, 1943, by Universal Pictures.

Plot

Cast        
Johnny Mack Brown as Gils Brandon / Buck Brandon 
Tex Ritter as Steve Rawlins
Fuzzy Knight as Cal Calkins
Jennifer Holt as Ellen Randall
Harry Woods as Blackie Dawson
Roy Barcroft as Slim Layton
Robert Barron as Judge Hickenbottom
Budd Buster as Bonanza Smith
Gil Patric as Perkins
Jimmy Wakely as Guitar Player
Johnny Bond as Concertina Player 
Scotty Harrel as Singer

References

External links
 

1943 films
American Western (genre) films
1943 Western (genre) films
Universal Pictures films
Films directed by Ray Taylor
American black-and-white films
1940s English-language films
1940s American films